The men's 800 metres was a track and field athletics event held as part of the athletics at the 1912 Summer Olympics programme.  It was the fifth appearance of the event, which is one of 12 athletics events to have been held at every Summer Olympics. The competition was held from Saturday, July 6, 1912, to Monday, July 8, 1912. Forty-seven runners from 16 nations competed. NOCs could enter up to 12 athletes. The event was won by Ted Meredith of the United States, the nation's third consecutive victory in the 800 metres. Mel Sheppard became the first man to win two medals in the event, coming in second to miss out on defending his 1908 gold. Ira Davenport completed the United States sweep, the second time the Americans had swept the 800 metres podium (after 1904).

Background

This was the fifth appearance of the event, which is one of 12 athletics events to have been held at every Summer Olympics. All three medalists from 1908, Olympic champion Mel Sheppard, the silver medalist Emilio Lunghi, and the bronze medalist Hanns Braun, returned. Sheppard was among the favorites with a chance to repeat; other prominent challengers were his teammates John Paul Jones and Ted Meredith as well as Lunghi (who had matched Sheppard's world record) and Braun (the 1911 and 1912 AAA champion).

Chile, Norway, Portugal, Russia, South Africa, and Turkey appeared in the event for the first time. Germany, Great Britain, Hungary, and the United States each made their fourth appearance, tied for the most among all nations.

Competition format

The competition expanded to three rounds for the first time. There were nine first-round heats of between 4 and 8 athletes each; the top two runners in each heat advanced to the semifinals. There were two semifinals with 9 athletes each; the top four runners in each semifinal advanced to the eight-man final.

Records

These were the standing world and Olympic records (in minutes) prior to the 1912 Summer Olympics.

(*) This track was 536.45 metres= mile in circumference.

The world record of 1:52.8, which had seemed fairly safe through the first two rounds of competition, was broken by all three medalists and tied by the fourth-place runner in the final. Mel Sheppard, the previous record-holder, and Ira Davenport beat the old record by .8 seconds at 1:52.0, taking silver and bronze behind Ted Meredith and his new record of 1:51.9. This record became the first official world record for the 800 metres.

Schedule

Results

Heats

All heats were held on Saturday, July 6, 1912.

Heat 1

Heat 2

Heat 3

Heat 4

Heat 5

Heat 6

Heat 7

Heat 8

Heat 9

Semifinals

Both semi-finals were held on Sunday, July 7, 1912. Jones withdrew to focus on the 1500 metres.

Semifinal 1

Semifinal 2

Final

The final took place on Monday, July 8, 1912.

References

External links
 
 

Men's 0800 metres
800 metres at the Olympics